The Battle of Rahon was fought between Sikhs and Mughal Empire on 11 October 1710.

Background
Banda Singh Bahadur captured almost half Punjab, east of Lahore and became the master of a region in eastern Punjab from river Indus to Satluj. This encouraged other local Sikhs who resided in districts of Jullundur Doab, to pick up arms, appoint their own tehsildars and thanedars and considered themselves capable enough to face Shamas Khan, the faujdar of Jullundur Doab. They addressed a letter to Shamas Khan demanding his submission and conveyance of all his treasure. Shamas, in an act of subterfuge, assumed a compliant disposition and sent a small consignment of goods hoping to placate the Sikhs, and in the meantime gathered his army and materials and advanced towards Rahon. Initially elated by Shamas' apparent submission, the Sikhs were disillusioned upon hearing the war preparations against them and decided to move their forces and call for reinforcements.

Battle
The Sikhs arrived at Rahon, hastily built a fortress, and issued threatening orders to the revenue payers and revenue officers for their submission. Shamas Khan and his army reached Rahon, surrounded the fort from all sides to attack the Sikhs, while the Sikhs responded with cannon attacks. The Sikhs realizing that they were outnumbered, retreated back to the fort of Rahon where they were besieged for several days. The Sikhs would attack the imperial forces at night, causing heavy casualties but it did not have much impact as the imperial force was overwhelmingly large, and realizing it as a disadvantage, they changed their strategy to mislead the imperial army, and departed surreptitiously in the middle of the night. Shamas Khan stopped the pursuit only after a few miles as he assumed a reinforcement by Banda Singh could arrive. Content with the seizure of the fort of Rahon and some treasure, Shamas Khan assumed the campaign to be a success and subsequently ordered the breaking up of the camp and the demobilization of his troops who were sent to their homes, stationed a garrison at the fort of Rahon, and returned to Sultanpur. However, as the Sikhs strategized, they remained hidden around the neighborhood of Rahon, and right after the evacuation, one thousand Sikhs attacked the garrisoned troops stationed in the fortress, routed them out and recaptured the fort.

Aftermath
After the victory and capture, the Sikhs reappointed their officers. Due to threatening orders, the chaudhries, muqaddams, qanungos and parganas surrendered. With the profit accumulated, the appointed Sikhs used Batai System, to give two part of the gains to peasants and kept one for themselves, bringing satisfaction to the peasants who happily agreed to work on the land under such conditions. The Sikhs then advanced and captured Jalandhar and Hoshiarpur and conquered the entire Jullundar Doab. Ten days later, Shamas Khan made a vigorous attack on Sirhind, recovered the fort, re-established a Mughal outpost and killed 1,000 Sikh horsemen.

See also 
 Rahon

References

Battles involving the Mughal Empire
Battles involving the Sikh Confederacy